Halta is a small village in the far south-east of Lebanon, near the border with Israel. The village has a mosque and an elementary school.

Demographics
Halta is divided into two parts: Upper and Lower Halta. The village has a population of almost 350 people.

Economy
Halta is related to the village of Kfarchouba (in the district of Hasbaya) and is famous for agriculture and grazing. The most important crops are olive oil, olives, cactus, figs, peaches, and grapes. Halta is also known for its fragrance of pine spread vast on the side of the town and nearby villages, trees Alkinh, and the number of perennial and seasonal large trees and shrubs.

Recreation
Halta is a popular destination for many of the statesmen and expatriates for the practice of hunting and during fishing seasons.

Climate
The climate is a little hot in summer and warm in winter.

Populated places in Hasbaya District